The Little Mermaid is an American animated television series produced by Walt Disney Television Animation based on the 1989 Disney film of the same name. It features the adventures of Ariel as a mermaid prior to the events of the film. This series is the third Disney television series to be spun off from a major animated film. Some of the voice actors of the film reprise their roles in the series, among them Jodi Benson as Ariel, Samuel E. Wright as Sebastian, Kenneth Mars as King Triton and Pat Carroll as Ursula. Other voice actors include Edan Gross and Bradley Pierce as Flounder, and Jeff Bennett as Prince Eric.

The Little Mermaid premiered in the fall of 1992, on September 11, with the animated prime time special called "A Whale of a Tale", then moved to Saturday mornings. This series originally appeared on CBS, with an original run from 1992 to November 26, 1994. Some of the episodes contain musical segments, featuring original songs written for the series. The opening theme to the show is an instrumental combination of the songs "Part of Your World", "Under the Sea" and "Kiss the Girl". The overture for the 2007 stage musical of The Little Mermaid is similar to this.

Premise
The Little Mermaid television series is a prequel to the movie of the same name. The story is set between the 2008 prequel film The Little Mermaid: Ariel's Beginning and the 1989 film, and follows Ariel's adventures as a mermaid still living under the sea with her father King Triton, Sebastian the crab and Flounder the fish. Various episodes highlight her relationships with her friends, father and sisters, and usually involve Ariel foiling the attempts of various enemies that intend ill harm to her, her family and friends, or her kingdom. Ariel's Beginning contains events that contradict the television series (such as Ariel's youth and first meeting with Flounder), making the TV series and the prequel independent continuities.

Characters

From the 1989 film 
Ariel (voiced by Jodi Benson) is the youngest daughter of the sea king. She loves singing and going on adventures. She also has developed magic in season 2 (episode 9) to save her world.
Flounder (voiced by Edan Gross, Season 1; Bradley Pierce, Seasons 2–3) is Ariel's best friend, a bright yellow and blue colored tropical reef fish who follows along on her adventures, and can be easily scared.
Sebastian (voiced by Samuel E. Wright) is a small red Jamaican-accented crab who acts as the king's adviser, court musician, a school teacher, a scout leader and a babysitter-like figure for Ariel.
King Triton (voiced by Kenneth Mars) is Ariel's father and ruler of Atlantica who protects his kingdom with his magic trident.
Scuttle (voiced by Maurice LaMarche) is a seagull who is friends with Ariel. He first appears in the episode "Scuttle". At first Ariel is afraid of him, but they become friends after he helps them rescue Sebastian.
Attina (voiced by Kath Soucie) is one of Ariel's six older sisters
Aquata (voiced by Mona Marshall), is one of Ariel's six older sisters
Andrina (voiced by Catherine Cavadini) is one of Ariel's six older sisters
Arista (voiced by Mary Kay Bergman) is one of Ariel's sisters. She has blonde cream colored hair tied in a half ponytail hair style and has a red tail and red seashells.
Adella (voiced by Sherry Lynn) is one of Ariel's six older sisters
Alana (voiced by Kimmy Robertson) is one of Ariel's six older sisters.
Ursula (voiced by Pat Carroll) is a powerful cecaelian sea witch who occasionally antagonizes Ariel.
Flotsam and Jetsam (voiced by Paddi Edwards) are Ursula's green moray eel informers who spy on others and show Ursula what they are seeing with their magic yellow eye, they have one eye white and the other yellow.
Prince Eric (voiced by Jeff Bennett) is Ariel's future husband. His first appearance is in the episode "Thingamajigger" and appears occasionally throughout the seasons with his dog, Max, as a puppy. Ariel first sees him saving a dolphin from a net, which technically makes this scene the first time she has ever seen Prince Eric, but does not know who he is. Eric also sees Ariel swimming on the surface for a couple of seconds but no one believed him.

Original characters
Urchin (voiced by Danny Cooksey) is a young orphan merboy and Ariel's friend. He shares her love for adventure and is unofficially her adopted brother, and at one point starts to develop romantic feelings for Ariel.
 The Lobster Mobster (voiced by Joe Alaskey) is a red-violet lobster gangster following the style of the 1920s gangster stereotype. Da Shrimp (voiced by David Lander) is his sidekick.
 The Evil Manta (voiced by Tim Curry) is an evil human/manta ray hybrid who repeatedly tries to take over Atlantica. He has a son named Little Evil who Ariel befriends in the episode "A Little Evil".
 Pearl (voiced by Cree Summer) is a spoiled, thrill-seeking mermaid whose actions often lead to Ariel, as well as herself, getting in trouble.
Spot (voiced by Frank Welker) is a killer whale calf whom Ariel adopted and secretly raised in the palace.
Gabriella is a mute mermaid who dreams of being able to sing. Gabriella's sign language is translated by her blue octopus friend Ollie (voiced by Whit Hertford). This character is based on a real person-(who was also named Gabriella) who was a fan of the show and died from leukemia during its first season.
 Moray (voiced by Dave Coulier) is a dark green moray eel salesman and con-artist who occasionally sells items to Ariel that alternately help her or get her into trouble.
 The Crabscouts (occasionally voiced by J. D. Daniels, Anndi McAfee, Bradley Pierce, Malachi Pearson, and Whit Hertford) are crab children, consisting of two boys and one girl, who are under the mentorship of Sebastian in a scout-like troop.
 Flo and Ebb (voiced by Kath Soucie and Richard Karron) are two brown alligator criminals who appear in the episode "Beached".
 The Magical Wishing Starfish (voiced by Tony Jay) is a giant starfish with a beard and crown who appears in the episode "Wish Upon a Starfish".
 Emperor Sharga (voiced by Jim Cummings) is the ruler of the Sharkanians, the aggressive shark-people who live in Sharkania similar to the merfolk who live in Atlantica. Sharga wishes to take over Atlantica someday.
The Ancient Seaclops (voiced by Jim Cummings) is an ancient one-eyed sea monster whose primary objective is to sleep every 1,000 years and wants to see it through more than anything else. He gets very angry when he is woken up abruptly by any loud noise and appeared in the episode "Calliope Dreams".
Dudley (voiced by Lawrence Montaigne) is an elderly sea turtle who serves as an assistant to King Triton other than Sebastian. He walks on the ocean floor unlike other sea turtles.
Hans Christian Andersen (voiced by Mark Hamill) is a fictionalised version of the author Hans Christian Andersen, who appears in the episode "Metal Fish" where he rides a fish-shaped submarine and sees Ariel, which inspires him to write the story "The Little Mermaid".
Archimedes (voiced by Rod McKuen) is a merman who knows about human things, appearing in "Metal Fish".

Production and development
After the success of the 1989 film, The Walt Disney Company planned to produce a children's television series for its Disney Channel cable outlet called The Little Mermaid's Island. The proposed series would feature puppets from Jim Henson's Creature Shop interacting with a "live" Ariel. But after Jim Henson's untimely death along with production difficulties and as the video release of The Little Mermaid soared in sales during 1990 and early 1991, Disney quietly dropped plans for "The Little Mermaid's Island" in favor of a more ambitious plan: an animated weekly series for CBS. The new show would be about the adventures of Ariel and her friends before the events in the film.

Jamie Mitchell, an artist and graphic designer who worked on Disney's Adventures of the Gummi Bears, was named the producer and director of the new series. Patsy Cameron and Tedd Anasti were the story editors and wrote almost all of the episodes for the show's second and third seasons. Their previous joint work included Hanna-Barbera's The Smurfs, the animated Beetlejuice and Disney's DuckTales. Some of the artists and technicians on the feature film also contributed to the TV series. Mark Dindal, chief of special animated effects for the film, was a consultant for special effects on the TV show. Robby Merkin, who worked with Alan Menken and Howard Ashman on arranging the songs for the film, worked as the arranger and music producer for the first season of the TV show.

Studios in China, Hong Kong, Taiwan, Vietnam, Korea, Japan and the Philippines contributed animation to the series.

Episodes

Series overview

Season 1 (1992)

Season 2 (1993)

Season 3 (1994)

Broadcast
The show's broadcast debut in September 1992 was in the form of a half-hour prime-time special, The Little Mermaid: A Whale of a Tale. Its Saturday morning debut came the very next day. The show's time slot was 8:30 a.m., following another new animated series, Fievel's American Tails, based on the animated film An American Tail. The Little Mermaid series drew a fair bit of media attention, including more than one spot on Entertainment Tonight, because it was the first series based directly on a Disney animated feature and was a rare television cartoon concerning a strong female character. The show kept its time slot the following year with its second season.

For the series' third season, the show was moved to the 8 a.m. time period and was the lead-in for a new Disney animated series, Aladdin. The third season was the final season to be produced; CBS elected not to buy another batch of episodes. On October 2, 1995, Disney Channel began rerunning the show seven days a week.

Disney Channel reran the series from October 2, 1995 to September 29, 2002 and again from September 5, 2006, to July 4, 2010. It was also shown on Toon Disney until January 25, 2008. The series then aired on Disney Junior from the channel's launch in 2012 until 2014. However in Russia continued air this show until the channel closed in 2022.

Home media

VHS releases
Seven VHS cassettes containing 14 episodes of the series were released in the United States and Canada. Almost simultaneously, the series' three double-feature LaserDiscs containing their 12 episodes were also released.

Ariel's Undersea Adventures:

Princess Collection - Ariel's Songs & Stories:

International releases
11 VHS cassettes containing 22 episodes of the series were released in Europe, Australia and New Zealand, and South Africa. Thes titles were also released on VHS, LaserDisc and Video CD in Mexico, South America, and Asia.

Ariel's Undersea Adventures:

Princess Collection:

DVD releases
The series has not yet been officially released on DVD. However, four episodes were released as part of the Disney Princess DVD releases.

Digital releases
As of August 24, 2018, all 31 episodes of the series are available for purchase on the iTunes Store and Amazon Prime Video in two volumes in High Definition (HD).

Since the service's launch on November 12, 2019, the series has been available with the exception of the pilot episode ("Whale of a Tale") through The Walt Disney Company's streaming platform Disney+, but the episodes have been cropped to 16:9.

Songs
 "Just a Little Love" (Ariel)
 "You Got to Be You" (Sebastian)
 "To the Edge of the Edge of the Sea" (Ariel)
 "To the Edge of the Edge of the Sea" (Reprise) (Ariel)
 "The Lobster Mobster's Mob" (The Lobster Mobster and Da Shrimp)
 "The Lobster Mobster's Mob "(Reprise) (Da Shrimp)
 "Beddie-Bye Blues" (The Lobster Mobster and Da Shrimp)
 "Sing a New Song" (Ariel and Simon)
 "In Harmony" (Ariel)
 "In Harmony" (Reprise) (Ariel)
 "Dis is de Life" (Sebastian)
 "You Know I Know" (Sebastian)
 "You Know I Know" (Reprise) (Sebastian)
 "Never Give Up" (Ariel and Sebastian)
 "Everybody Cha-Cha-Cha" (Sebastian)
 "You Wouldn't Want to Mess with Me" (Ursula)
 "You Wouldn't Want to Mess with Me" (Reprise) (Ursula)
 "The Sound of Laughter" (Sebastian)
 "The Sound of Laughter" (Repeat) (Sebastian)
 "Daring to Dance" (Ariel)
 "Daring to Dance" (Reprise) (Ariel)
 "Hail Apollo, Defender of the Sea" (Atlantica's Army)
 "I Just Like the Sky" (Scuttle)
 "Just Give Me a Chance" (Scuttle)
 "Just Give Me a Chance" (Reprise) (Scuttle)
 "I Go to the Beach" (Sebastian)
 "Just Like Me" (The Evil Manta)
 "Let's Play Princess (With Ariel)" (opening for Princess Collection VHS)

Music CD album release:

Reception
Common Sense Media gave the series a two out of five stars, writing, "Spin-off sinks for everyone except besotted fans."

Accolades

Spin-off
The series received a spin-off entitled Sebastian the Crab, which aired as a segment of the TV series Marsupilami. The segments star Sebastian, and are set outside of the sea, taking place after the wedding between Ariel and Eric in the film.

References

External links
 
 

1990s American animated television series
1992 American television series debuts
1994 American television series endings
American children's animated adventure television series
American children's animated fantasy television series
American prequel television series
CBS original programming
TV series
English-language television shows
Mermaids in television
Animated television shows based on films
Animated television series about fish
Animated television series about arthropods
Witchcraft in television
Television series based on Disney films
Television series based on adaptations
Television series by Disney Television Animation
Television series about princesses
Television shows based on The Little Mermaid